William Allen (c. 1790 – 17 October 1856) was  the joint founder of St Peter's College, Adelaide, South Australia.

William Allen was born in England. Entering the navy of the British East India Company at age 15 and serving on the Sullimany, he afterwards transferred to the merchant service, and for about 25 years traded from India. About 1833 or 1834, when Allen was captain of the Ann, the crew rose in mutiny and killed one of the mates. Allen knocked the leader down with an oar and practically quelled the mutiny single-handed and took the ship to Singapore where the mutineers were tried and the leaders executed.

Allen returned to England in 1837, having inherited his parents' property on their death. He found it hard to settle down however, and sailed to Adelaide aboard the Buckinghamshire in March 1839. He bought 809 ha (2000 acres) of land in the neighbourhood of Port Gawler with his friend Captain John Ellis. In 1845 he was a part proprietor of the Burra copper mine and, joining in the foundation of the South Australian Mining Association, subsequently became its chairman.

He took an interest in the Church of England and in the words of Bishop Augustus Short became "the greatest temporal benefactor - next after the Baroness Burdett-Coutts - whom the diocese has yet been permitted to know". On 24 May 1849, when the foundation-stone of St Peter's College was laid, William Allen and the Society for Promoting Christian Knowledge were referred to as "being the Principal Founders". Allen's gifts to this school, one of the earliest public schools established in Australia, eventually reached £7000. Allen visited England again in 1853, upon his return to South Australia he retired from his pastoral activities.

Although the majority of Allen's benefactions went to the Church of England, they were not confined to it, he was well known for his private charity. He died suddenly at Adelaide on 17 October 1856. Under his will £5000 was left to the diocese of Adelaide to be used in increasing the incomes of the clergy.

References

See also
 

1790 births
1856 deaths
Settlers of South Australia
19th-century Australian philanthropists
English philanthropists
English sailors
19th-century Australian businesspeople
English emigrants to colonial Australia